Healthcare-NOW! is a non-profit grassroots coalition in support of the single-payer health care movement for the United States. Healthcare-NOW!'s stated goal is to implement the Medicare for All Act.

History
Healthcare-NOW! was founded in 2004, originally under the name of the Campaign for a National Health Program NOW (CNHP NOW). The first meeting of the coalition was the Campaign for a National Health Program NOW Conference: "Health Care Crisis and Election of 2004." On August 31 and September 1, 2004, the conference was held as well as a rally during the Republican Convention.

Organizing methodology
Healthcare-NOW! uses various community organizing methods.  Strategies and ideas are developed through annual national strategy meetings with volunteer organizers and health care activists around the country, including Rep. John Conyers. In 2007, Healthcare-NOW launched traveling Road Shows promoting single payer reform, as well as co-sponsored an Annual Health Care Justice Vigil held each September in Washington D.C. Other techniques include Sicko House Parties and Truth Hearings. On June 19, 2008, Healthcare-NOW! joined efforts with other organizations, including the California Nurses Association, to initiate the National Day of Protest Against Health Insurance Companies. This National Day of Protest took place in 18 cities nationwide in support of a single payer system.
It was a campaign mainly about public health care not private.

Personnel
Healthcare-NOW is composed of 36 board members, in addition to the board of directors. The National Coordinator was Marilyn Clement.

Board member co-chairs
 Quentin Young, National Coordinator, Physicians for a National Health Program
 Leo Gerard, President, United Steelworkers Union
 Jim Winkler, General Secretary, General Board of Church and Society, United Methodist Church
 Rose Ann DeMoro, Executive Director of the California Nurses Association

See also

 Health care reform in the United States
 List of healthcare reform advocacy groups in the United States
 Medicare (United States)
 Single-payer health care
 Medicare for All Act
 Universal health care

Notes and references

External links
 Healthcare-NOW! official website

Healthcare reform advocacy groups in the United States
Organizations established in 2004
Medical and health organizations based in Massachusetts